Elly Tibina Koot (born 1943) is a Dutch model who won the 1964 Miss Europe contest in Beirut, Lebanon.

She was born in Rotterdam, where her mother was visiting family, but grew up in Amsterdam on the Singel near the Bloemenmarkt. She was discovered by the fashion photographer Hans Dukkers. She married Frank Brandt in 1966. She and Brandt (at that time a photographer) met while shooting a commercial for Rexona - a brand of deodorant - for which he was a stand in model. From 1970 she also modeled in the United States for the Wilhelmina Models agency. In the 70s she was sometimes a jury member at Dutch beauty contests.
In 1976 she developed Cushing's disease for which she had a successful surgery in the United States. Since 1996 she is Dame de Salon of Mart Visser's fashion house in Amsterdam.

References

External links 
 

1943 births
Living people
Dutch female models
Dutch beauty pageant winners
Miss Europe winners
Models from Amsterdam
People from Rotterdam